K-2 is a  state highway in the south-central portion of the U.S. state of Kansas. Its southern terminus is at an intersection with U.S. Route 281 (US-281) east of Hardtner and its northern terminus is at an intersection with K-42 west of the town of Viola. Along the way K-2 passes through the cities of Kiowa, Hazelton, Anthony and Harper. Between the latter two, it has an overlap with US-160.

Before state highways were numbered in Kansas, there were auto trails. A short section of K-2 west of Kiowa follows the former Oklahoma-Kansas-Colorado Highway. K-2 was designated on January 7, 1937, and went from US-160 north to K-42 in Norwich. Between 1961 and 1963, K-2 was extended in both directions, eastward to overlap with K-14 to US-281 and westward to overlap K-42 to US-54. On December 24, 1994, the overlaps with K-42 and K-14 were eliminated.

Route description
K-2's southern terminus is at US-281 east of Hardtner in Barber County. The highway proceeds east for  through flat rural farmlands then crosses Little Mule Creek. The highway continues east for another  then curves south at Coats Street. K-2 then quickly curves back east at Bare Road and continues for another  then enters Kiowa as Main Street. The highway has an at-grade crossing with a BNSF Railway. K-2 then intersects the northern terminus of the southern leg of K-8 (4th Street). K-2 continues east for  then turns north onto 7th Street. The highway continues north through the city then begins to curve northeast at Hardtner Street and soon exits the city as it passes by a school. K-2 continues northeast, parallel to the railroad track, for roughly  then crosses Medicine Lodge River. The highway continues through rural farmlands for another  then crosses Lone Tree Canyon. It continues another roughly  along the railroad track then enters Hazelton. K-2 continues for about  then exits the city into rural farmlands. The highway continues to parallel the railroad track for another  then crosses Salty Creek. It continues through rural farmlands for another  and crosses into Harper County. As K-2 enters the county it crosses Little Sandy Creek then curves east away from the railroad. It continues east for about  then intersects 80 Avenue, which travels south to Waldron.

K-2 continues for another , crosses Spring Creek, and then enters Anthony as Main Street about  later. After about  K-2 turns north, at the western terminus of K-44. K-2 continues north for about  then exits the city. The highway continues through flat rural farmlands for about  then intersects US-160, which it begins to overlap. The highway continues past the Harper Municipal Airport then turns east onto 14th Street, which is the southern terminus of K-14. K-2 and US-160 continue through the city for  then K-2 turns north and US-160 continues east. K-2 heads north for a short distance then curves northeast and exits the city. The highway then crosses over a BNSF railroad track then crosses Sand Creek. It continues northeast through more farmlands for  then crosses Spring Creek. K-2 continues northeast, passing through Runnymede, then crosses Chikaskia River. The highway continues for roughly  then enters into Kingman County. The highway continues for  then crosses a Kansas and Oklahoma Railway. It continues another  then enters into Sumner County. It then reaches its northern terminus at K-42 west of Viola.

The Kansas Department of Transportation (KDOT) tracks the traffic levels on its highways, and in 2019, they determined that on average the traffic varied from 500 vehicles per day slightly northeast of Hazelton to 3960 vehicles per day slightly north of Anthony. K-2 is not included in the National Highway System. The National Highway System is a system of highways important to the nation's defense, economy, and mobility. The  section of K-2's alignment within Anthony is maintained by the city. The section of K-2 in Harper from K-14 to the north city line is maintained by the city.

History
Prior to the formation of the Kansas state highway system, there were auto trails, which were an informal network of marked routes that existed in the United States and Canada in the early part of the 20th century. A short section of K-2 west of Kiowa follows the former Oklahoma-Kansas-Colorado Highway.

K-2 was originally designated in 1927, from Norton west to the Colorado border. Then between 1930 and 1931, K-2 became part of US-36 when it was extended west into Colorado. The current K-2 was designated on January 7, 1937, and went from US-160 to K-42 in Norwich. Until 1950, K-2 turned northward onto current SE 150th Avenue south of Norwich and ended at K-42 in Norwich. Then in a January 1, 1950 resolution, the turn was eliminated and it continued northeastward to end at K-42 east of Norwich. Between 1961 and 1963, K-2 was extended in both directions, eastward to overlap with K-14 to US-281 and westward to overlap K-42 to US-54. In mid May 1967, the SHC approved a bid of $88,694 (equivalent to $ in  dollars) to rebuild the junction with K-42 east of Norwich. Then in two separate December 24, 1994 resolutions, the concurrency with K-42 became K-42 only, and the concurrency with K-14 became K-2 only.

Major intersections

References

External links

Kansas Department of Transportation State Map
KDOT: Historic State Maps

002
Transportation in Barber County, Kansas
Transportation in Harper County, Kansas
Transportation in Kingman County, Kansas
Transportation in Sumner County, Kansas